Pavagadh ropeway is a ropeway on Pavagadh hill in Pavagadh, Panchmahal district, Gujarat, India. It was opened in 1986.

History
Pavagadh hill is a major pilgrim site because of presence of the Kalika Mata Temple, a Shakti Peetha, as well as tourism site due to the presence of several monuments of Champaner-Pavagadh Archaeological Park, a UNESCO World Heritage Site.

Pavagadh ropeway was opened in 1986. The construction and operation is managed by Usha Breco Limited.

On 19 January 2003, seven people were killed and 24 were injured in a ropeway accident.

Technical features
Pavagadh ropeway,  in length, is said to be the country's highest then. It operates mono-cable gondola detachable type lifts. A trip takes 6 minutes.

From there, the passenger has to climb  to reach the temple. It has a capacity to carry 1250 passengers per hour but operates at capacity of 400 passengers per hour. It transports 13 lakh passengers annually.

There is a proposal of new -long ropeway which will take passengers further and alight them 30-40m from the temple.

See also
 Jain temples, Pavagadh
 Aerial lift in India
 Girnar ropeway
 Ambaji ropeway
 Saputara ropeway

References

1986 establishments in Gujarat
Transport in Gujarat
Aerial tramways in India
Buildings and structures in Gujarat
Champaner-Pavagadh Archaeological Park
Transport infrastructure completed in 1986